The Harvard Club of New York City, commonly called The Harvard Club, is a private social club located in Midtown Manhattan, New York City. Its membership is limited to alumni, faculty, and boardmembers of Harvard University.

Incorporated in 1887, it is housed in adjoining lots at 27 West 44th Street and 35 West 44th Street. The original wing, built in 1894, was designed in red brick neo-Georgian style by Charles Follen McKim of McKim, Mead & White.

Clubhouse history
Founded without a location in 1865 by a group of Harvard University alumni, the club rented a townhouse for use as a clubhouse in 1887 on 22nd Street. In 1888, the club acquired land on 44th Street intending to build a new clubhouse there. Many other clubs later located on what came to be called Clubhouse Row: the Penn Club of New York, (in 1901); the Cornell Club of New York (in 1989); the New York Yacht Club (in 1899); the Yale Club of New York City (in 1915); and the Princeton Club of New York (in 1963).

The Harvard Club selected architect Charles Follen McKim, of McKim, Mead & White, for the project. The design was Georgian style of architecture with Harvard brick and Indiana limestone. The building's 1894 façade is reminiscent of McKim, Mead and White's 1901 gates at Harvard Yard. In 1905, Harvard Hall, the Grill Room, a new library, a billiard room, and two floors of guest rooms were added.

In 1915, McKim, Mead & White doubled the building's size by constructing the Main Dining Room, a bar, additional guestrooms, banquet rooms, and athletic facilities including a 7th floor swimming pool.

In 2003, the architects Davis Brody Bond, under the direction of J. Max Bond, Jr., added a 40,000-square-foot annex on West 44th Street, with a facade clad in limestone and fenestrated with large glass windows.

Admission of women
In the spring of 1970, four Harvard Business School students—Ellen Marram, Katie Metzger, Roslyn Braeman Payne, and Lynn Salvage—were turned away from membership interviews at the Harvard Club of New York, because the club admitted only men. That fall, Marram and Salvage wrote to Morgan Wheelock, the president of the Harvard Club of New York, to request that women be granted equal membership privileges. Wheelock rejected the request. In January 1971, Marram and Salvage began a letter-writing campaign to the new president, Albert H. Gordon. A group of Harvard alumni seeking club membership met with Gordon in the fall of 1971, but Gordon initially denied the delegation's request to bring women's membership to a vote.

A Harvard Law School alumna, Marguerite "Mitzi" Filson, suggested the group take legal action against the Harvard Club. Marram, Salvage, Metzler, Payne, and Filson, represented pro bono by Jed S. Rakoff, then prepared a gender discrimination claim to file with the New York Commission on Human Rights. In response, Gordon agreed to put the matter to a vote. Shortly before the vote, several Harvard alumnae—including attorney and activist Brenda Feigen, cofounder of the ACLU Women's Rights Project—sued the Harvard Club in federal court seeking revocation of the club's liquor license on sex discrimination grounds. Nevertheless, on May 4, 1972, the club voted to deny full membership rights to women. A majority of members (1,654 to 854) supported membership for women, but the vote fell 18 votes short of the required two-thirds.
Marram, Salvage, Metzler, Payne, and Filson then filed their complaint with the New York Commission on Human Rights. In addition, Commission chairwoman Eleanor Holmes Norton issued a two-page letter condemning the Harvard Club's exclusion of women. After the parties came before a New York Human Rights administrative judge, the Harvard Club's Board of Managers called another vote. On January 11, 1973, the club voted 2,097 to 695 to admit female members.

Membership
To be eligible for election to membership, a candidate must hold a degree or honorary degree from Harvard, be a tenured faculty member at the university, or serve as an officer, or member of any board or committee of the university. Dues levied are on a sliding scale, based on age and proximity to the club. Like most private clubs, members of the Harvard Club are given reciprocal benefits at clubs around the United States and the world.

The building is sometimes used for outside corporate events such as business conferences.

Notable members
Michael Bloomberg, Harvard Business School Class of 1966, Mayor of New York City
Richard Edelman
John F. Kennedy, Class of 1940
Reginald Lewis, Law, class of 1968, first African American to build a billion-dollar company
John Jay McKelvey Sr., founder of Harvard Law Review
Franklin D. Roosevelt, Class of 1903
Theodore Roosevelt, Class of 1881
James Toback, Class of 1966
Frederick M. Warburg, Class of 1919

Philanthropy
The HCNY Foundation has a scholarship fund that helps support 20 undergraduates at Harvard College and several students in graduate programs, as well as international student exchange programs.

Gallery

References

Further reading
H. Horatio Joyce, "New York's Harvard House and the Origins of an Alumni Culture in America," in Gillin, Edward, and H. Horatio Joyce, eds. Experiencing Architecture in the Nineteenth Century: Buildings and Society in the Modern Age. London: Bloomsbury Publishing, 2018.

External links 

Official website

Clubhouses on the National Register of Historic Places in Manhattan
Clubs and societies in New York City
Culture of Manhattan
Gentlemen's clubs in New York City
Harvard University
McKim, Mead & White buildings
Midtown Manhattan
New York City Designated Landmarks in Manhattan
Organizations established in 1887